Nimy is a town of Wallonia and a district of the municipality of Mons, located in the province of Hainaut, Belgium.

It was a municipality until the fusion of the Belgian municipalities in 1977.

History

In 1914, it was the scene of heavy fighting during the Battle of Mons, the first action of the British Expeditionary Force in World War I.
Notable for its earthenware pottery.

Gallery 

Sub-municipalities of Mons
Former municipalities of Hainaut (province)